Every Step You Take may refer to:

 Every Step You Take (The Unit), an episode of The Unit
 Every Step You Take (TV series), a 2015 Hong Kong television series